SCSR can be:
 Self-contained self-rescue device, a portable oxygen source
 Single Channel Signaling Rate